Bojacá is a municipality and town of the Western Savanna Province, Colombia in the department of Cundinamarca. The municipality borders Zipacón, Madrid and Facatativá in the north, Madrid and Mosquera in the east, Soacha and San Antonio del Tequendama in the south and Tena, La Mesa and Zipacón in the west.

Etymology 
The name Bojacá comes from Chibcha and means "Purple enclosure".

History 
The area around Bojacá was inhabited at least since 3410 years BP (1400 BCE), evidenced by archaeological excavations from the Herrera Period performed in Aguazuque, Zipacón and around Lake Herrera, Mosquera. The territories were already important in the times before the Spanish conquest when Bojacá was part of the Muisca Confederation; a loose confederation of rulers of the Muisca.

On his expedition to El Dorado and after conquering the Muisca, conquistador Gonzalo Jiménez de Quesada founded modern Bojacá on October 16, 1537.

Economy 
Main economical activities of Bojacá are agriculture and livestock farming. Among the agricultural products cultivated are potatoes, carrots, maize, lettuce and fruits as blackberries, strawberries, prunes and the typical Colombian fruits uchuva, tree tomato and granadilla.

Gallery

References 

Municipalities of Cundinamarca Department
Populated places established in 1537
1537 establishments in the Spanish Empire
1537 disestablishments in the Muisca Confederation
Muysccubun